Wings of War, by Andrea Angiolino and Pier Giorgio Paglia, is a modular boardgame collection published by Nexus Editrice and dedicated to air combat. A new edition is published by Ares Games as Wings of Glory.

The games mix card game, board game, and miniature wargaming mechanics to simulate air combat in the 20th century. The first collection is dedicated to the First World War, while a second collection is about the Second World War. The air images and cover scenes are by Vincenzo Auletta, and the landscapes on the cards are by Dario Calì. The graphic design is by Fabio Maiorana. The illustrations are based on extensive historical research.

First released in Italian in 2004, the game had an official English edition by Fantasy Flight Games. Other official editions have appeared in German, Greek, French, Spanish, Dutch, Russian, Polish, Czech, Portuguese, Swedish, Finnish and Japanese, besides translations into other languages.

In 2011 the distribution of Wings of War in English was dropped by Fantasy Flight Games. Shortly thereafter Nexus announced that it was closing down. The licence to produce Wings of War (rebadged as Wings of Glory) then passed to a new Italian company, Ares Games, who now directly distributes the product in English.

Game mechanics
Each plane is depicted on a card and has a set of maneuver cards specifically designed for it, with large arrows on them. The player controlling the plane plans his turn choosing three of the maneuver cards in sequence and putting them face down on the gaming mat. All players then reveal their first maneuver card at the same time, put it in front of the plane card and move the latter so that the little arrowhead on the rear of the plane card matches the one in front of the maneuver card. In this way, planes can then "fly" on the table or the floor.

A ruler is used to see if a plane has enemy planes (cards) in his field of fire. If so, the player chooses one target that must take a damage card with a random number of points (optional rules cover special damages too). Short range fire (up to half ruler of distance) mean two damage cards rather than one.

The different planes available determine the firepower, maneuver cards available, and number of damage points able to be sustained before being eliminated and are based on that planes historic performance.

First World War Series
The First World War series consists of three standalone sets and a number of expansions. The first two sets are Wings of War - Famous Aces (Nexus Editrice 2004) and Wings of War - Watch your back! (Nexus Editrice 2005). Famous Aces includes a selection of single seater fighters with personal colors of the most renowned aces of World War I. Watch your back! adds other fighters and some two-seaters allowing bombings, reconnaissance missions and other special scenarios. The third set, Burning Drachens (Nexus Editrice 2005) adds  observation balloons, AA guns, air-to-air Le Prieur rockets, trench systems, and optional altitude rules.  Burning Drachens includes rules for solo play as well as multi-player dogfights, bombing runs, and strafing or reconnaissance missions. Each set allows 2/4 people to play. The sets can be combined to make larger and more varied scenarios, the number of players being effectively limited by the number of maneuver decks.

An expansion was released in 2010, Wings of War - Flight of the Giants adds heavy bombers into the game and serves as an extension to any of the standalone sets.

A number of booster packs add new plane types to the game. Each booster pack contains 2 or 3 manoeuvre decks and several aircraft cards. The booster packs can only be used by owners of at least one standalone set.

Second World War Series
Wings of War - Dawn of War (Nexus Editrice 2007) allows 2/6 players to engage in dogfights with the most famous fighters and ground-attack planes of 1939-1943. The game system is quite different from the one of the World War I collection, so it can not be mixed with other sets.  "Squadron" booster packs for the World War II series are Wings of War- Eagles of the Reich and Wings of War- Flying Legend.

Wings of War Miniatures

Wings of War Miniatures adds war game miniatures to Wings of War by introducing model airplanes on 1/144 scale that are used in place of the airplane cards.  The miniatures are made of pre-painted pewter and plastic and come with a gaming base and a set of maneuver cards.  A number of different  miniatures have been created, and serve as an extension to Wings of War - Famous Aces, Wings of War - Watch your back!, and Wings of War - Burning Drachens.

References

External links
Official site
Wings of War fan discussion group
Wings of War Aerodrome Missions, Campaigns and Custom Cards

Card games introduced in 2004
Dedicated deck card games
World War I games
World War II games
Fantasy Flight Games games